The River Seven is a river in North Yorkshire, England.

After leaving Danby High Moor, the river flows through Rosedale and passes Rosedale Abbey.  In its lower course, it meanders due to interlocking spurs. A number of villages lie along the lower course of the River Seven. Some of these date from the 12th century or earlier, and likely none of them would exist if not for the river. For early settlers, the river may have been the only source of water and fertile land in its flood plains. They relied on the river for fishing, and washing. There are fossils in the sedimentary layers in the river, in the Jurassic layer of rock.

Geology 

The River Seven is a small river, with not much influence on the geology of the area, although over time it has exposed various rock zones. The lacustrine deposits from the last ice age are exposed and visible in the bed of the river. There are three different time zones (periods) in the area. 
 Lower Jurassic
 Middle Jurassic
 Upper Jurassic
The rock types consist of : Corallian Limestone (top layer), Oxford Clay, Raven-scar Limestone and Shales and Ironstone.

These are split up depending on their rock band and type. Over time the North York Moors are sliding downhill: you can tell this from the new bands of rock visible in the northern regions.

Hydrology 
Since 1974 the river levels and flows of the Seven have been measured at a weir near Normanby in its lower reaches.

Land use is primarily rural, made up of grassland, forest and moorland in the upper reaches.

The river has a natural flow regime, unaffected by direct artificial influences.

Settlements 
 Thorgill
 Rosedale Abbey
 Cropton
 Appleton-le-Moors
 Sinnington
 Marton
 Normanby
 Great Barugh
 Brawby

References

External links 

Seven